Clarkedale is a town in Crittenden County, Arkansas, United States. Per the 2020 census, the population was 336. Clarkedale incorporated on November 15, 2000.

Demographics

2020 census

Note: the US Census treats Hispanic/Latino as an ethnic category. This table excludes Latinos from the racial categories and assigns them to a separate category. Hispanics/Latinos can be of any race.

Education
Clarkedale is in the Marion School District. Its comprehensive high school is Marion High School.

References

Cities in Crittenden County, Arkansas
Cities in Arkansas